Digital Juice, Inc is an American company providing royalty-free content for professional video, print, and presentations. The company sells packaged content products direct to customers. Digital Juice was founded in 1992 and was originally based out of Ocala, Florida. Digital Juice has offices in Florida and Bangalore, India.

History
The company was founded in 1992 by David Hebel under the name Dimension Technologies Media Group as a developer of third party products for the Video Toaster.  In 1995 the company released Club Toaster which was a monthly CD-ROM based product for the Amiga.  The product contained animated backgrounds, still graphics, music, photos, articles, and product reviews.  By 1997 Dimension Technologies was looking to move from developing for the Amiga and instead focus on Windows and Mac based content.  The company renamed itself in 1997 to Digital Juice after the release of their first non-Amiga based product, Digital Juice for PowerPoint.

In 2003, Digital Juice introduced their own online network called Digital Juice Television. At first it was limited to simple product demos and trade show coverage, but was expanded in early 2006 to include several new series involving tutorials and training videos.

In October 2007, Digital Juice finalized acquisition of The Ballistic Pixel Labs.

Awards and distinctions
In 2002, the company received the top award, out of 250 nominees, in the "New Business" category from the University of Tampa's, John H Sykes School Of Business.

References

External links 
Digital Juice website

Film and video technology